In the Catholic Church, a secular institute is one of the forms of consecrated life recognized in Church law (1983 Code of Canon Law Canons 710–730). 

Secular consecrated persons profess the Evangelical counsels of chastity, poverty, and obedience while living in the world, as compared to members of a religious institute who belong to a particular congregations, often with specific apostolates.

Description 
The historical origins of these institutes go back to the end of the sixteenth century, even though their juridic recognition as a state of consecrated life approved by the Church took place only on 2 February 1947, with Pope Pius XII's Apostolic Constitution Provida Mater Ecclesia. 

Most members of secular institutes do not live together—though some do. They lead their normal lives “in the world” in a variety of occupations. Each institute has a particular spirituality shaped by its founders and leaders.

Secular institutes are recognized either by a bishop (diocesan right) or by the Holy See. Most are registered with the World Conference of Secular Institutes. There are nine secular institutes in the UK; these institutes belong to the National Conference of Secular Institutes (NCSI), an association for cooperation and mutual support of those secular institutes which have membership in the United Kingdom. The NCSI is affiliated with the Conference Mondiale des Instituts Seculiers (CMIS) which represents all secular institutes in the world. There are 30 secular institutes in the United States  As of 2018, CMIS reported a total of 184 secular institutes worldwide.

The exact number of members of secular institutes worldwide is unclear. A 2018 survey by CMIS reported approximately 24,000 members, but noted that not all institutes surveyed provided data, and that some institutes provided inconsistent responses. Most of the members of secular institutes are lay people. Some join as diocesan priests or deacons, and some institutes are founded specifically for diocesan priests who wish to take vows and lead a consecrated life while still being incardinated in their diocese and working in the diocesan framework. Some secular institutes even train and incardinate their own priests.

Notable secular institutes 
Caritas Christi
 Company of St. Ursula
 Institute of the Maids of the Poor (M.O.P.)
Institute of the Priests of the Heart of Jesus
 Schoenstatt Apostolic Movement
 Secular Institute Madonna della Strada
 Secular Institute Pius X (I.S.P.X.)
 Servite Secular Institute (S.S.I.)
 Voluntas Dei Institute

See also

Religious institute
Society of apostolic life
Vocational discernment in the Catholic Church

References

External links
 Concerning Secular Institutes in the Code of Canon Law (1983), can. 710–730
 Provida Mater Ecclesia at the Vatican website
 United States Conference of Secular Institutes
 World Conference of Secular Institutes

Catholic lay organisations